In mathematics, a Bézout matrix (or Bézoutian or Bezoutiant) is a special square matrix associated with two polynomials, introduced by  and  and named after Étienne Bézout.  Bézoutian may also refer to the determinant of this matrix, which is equal to the resultant of the two polynomials. Bézout matrices are sometimes used to test the stability of a given polynomial.

Definition
Let  and  be two complex polynomials of degree at most n,

(Note that any coefficient  or  could be zero.) The Bézout matrix of order n associated with the polynomials f and g is 

where the entries  result from the identity

It is an n × n complex matrix, and its entries are such that if we let  for each , then:

To each Bézout matrix, one can associate the following bilinear form, called the Bézoutian:

Examples
 For n = 3, we have for any polynomials f and g of degree (at most) 3:

 Let  and  be the two polynomials.  Then:

The last row and column are all zero as f and g have degree strictly less than n (which is 4).

Properties
  is symmetric (as a matrix);
 ;
 ;
  is a bilinear function;
  is a real matrix if f and g have real coefficients;
  is nonsingular with  if and only if f and g have no common roots.
  with  has determinant which is the resultant of f and g.

Applications
An important application of Bézout matrices can be found in control theory. To see this, let f(z) be a complex polynomial of degree n and denote by q and p the real polynomials such that f(iy) = q(y) + ip(y) (where y is real). Then, we have the following statements:
 f(z) has n − r roots in common with its conjugate;
 the left r roots of f(z) are located in such a way that:
 (r + σ)/2 of them lie in the open left half-plane, and
 (r − σ)/2 lie in the open right half-plane;
 f is Hurwitz stable if and only if  is positive definite.

The third statement gives a necessary and sufficient condition concerning stability.  Besides, the first statement exhibits some similarities with a result concerning Sylvester matrices while the second one can be related to Routh–Hurwitz theorem.

References

 
 

Polynomials
Matrices